The eleventh and final season of M*A*S*H aired Mondays at 9:00–9:30 pm ET on CBS, as part of the 1982–83 United States network television schedule.

Cast

Episodes

Notes

External links 
 List of M*A*S*H (season 11) episodes at the Internet Movie Database

1982 American television seasons
1983 American television seasons
MASH 11